Jamason Faanana-Schultz (born 13 June 1996) is an Australian-born American rugby union player who plays as a flanker or number 8. He currently plays for Old Glory DC of Major League Rugby (MLR).

Rugby Career

Faanana-Schultz was born and raised in Australia and got his start in rugby there. He spent time in the Queensland Reds academy system and played for Queensland University. In 2016 he joined Southern Districts in the Shute Shield, and a successful campaign led to him joining the Warratahs of Super Rugby on a development contract, although he didn't play for them. In 2017, he played in one match for Auckland in the NPC.

His professional debut came in 2018 with the Red Hurricanes of the Top Challenge League in Japan. He then signed with the Houston SaberCats in Major League Rugby (MLR). At the end of the 2019 MLR season, he returned to Japan, playing for the Kurita Water Gush in the Japan Top League.

In 2020, he joined MLR expansion team Old Glory DC. He became a fixture on the team, starting every match he was available for through his first two seasons with the team.

International career

In 2015, Faanana-Schultz represented Samoa internationally at the u20 level.

He was also qualified to play internationally for the United States, courtesy of his father being born in San Francisco, California. He debuted for the USA Eagles in 2019 against Canada in the Pacific Nations Cup, earning two caps in that competition. He was not selected for the 2019 Rugby World Cup, but once again played for the USA in the summer of 2021, earning three more caps.

References

External links
 ItsRugby Profile

1996 births
Living people
Australian rugby union players
Australian sportspeople of Samoan descent
Australian people of American descent 
Houston SaberCats players
Old Glory DC players
Rugby union players from Brisbane
United States international rugby union players
Rugby union flankers
Rugby union number eights
Auckland rugby union players
NTT DoCoMo Red Hurricanes Osaka players
Kurita Water Gush Akishima players